The Blue Mask is a 1982 album by singer-songwriter Lou Reed.

The Blue Mask may also refer to:

 The Blue Mask, or Thebluemask, the production name of Simon Wilkinson (composer)
"The Blue Mask", a 2003 short story by Joel Lane

See also
"The Girl in the Blue Mask", episode of Criminal Minds: Suspect Behavior